Aviation Thermobaric Bomb of Increased Power (ATBIP; , АВБПМ), nicknamed "Father of All Bombs" (FOAB), is a Russian-designed, bomber-delivered thermobaric weapon.

The bomb is reportedly similar to the US military's GBU-43/B Massive Ordnance Air Blast which is often unofficially called "Mother of All Bombs" derived from its official military acronym "MOAB". This weapon would therefore be the most powerful conventional (non-nuclear) weapon in the world. However, the veracity of Russia's claims concerning the weapon's size and power have been questioned by US defense analysts.

"FOAB" was successfully field-tested in the late evening of 11 September 2007. The new weapon is to replace several smaller types of nuclear bombs in the Russian arsenal.

Description

The thermobaric device yields the equivalent of 44 tons of TNT using about seven tons of a new type of high explosive. Because of this, the bomb's blast and pressure wave have a similar effect to a small tactical nuclear weapon. The bomb works by detonating in mid-air. Most damage is inflicted by a supersonic shockwave and extremely high temperatures. Thermobaric weapons differ from conventional explosive weapons in that they generate a longer, more sustained blast wave with greater temperatures. In doing so, they produce more damage over a larger area than a conventional weapon of similar mass.

Operational history
On 8 September 2017, unconfirmed reports of the Russian Defense Ministry announced it had tested the FOAB in combat for the first time in Syria as a part of its military campaign in the region.

Claims
According to General Aleksandr Rukshin, the Russian Deputy Chief of Staff, the new bomb was smaller than the MOAB but much deadlier because the temperature at the centre of the blast is twice as high. He claimed the bomb's capabilities are comparable to nuclear weapons, but unlike nuclear weaponry known for its radioactive fallout, use of the weapon does not damage or pollute the environment beyond the blast radius.

In comparison, the MOAB produces the equivalent of 11 tons of TNT from 8 tons of high explosive. The blast radius of the FOAB is 300 meters, almost double that of the MOAB, and the temperature produced is twice as high.

Analysis and veracity
Some defense analysts question both the yield of the bomb and whether it could be deployed by a Tupolev Tu-160 bomber. A report by Wired says photos and the video of the event suggest that it is designed to be deployed from the rear of a slow moving cargo plane, and they note that the bomb-test video released by the Russians never shows both the bomb and the bomber in the same camera shot. There are also questions on what type of explosives it used. They quoted Tom Burky, a senior research scientist at Battelle, saying "It's not even clear what kind of weapon the Russians tested." He questions if it was what some experts call a fuel-air explosive or if it was a thermobaric weapon. "Fuel-air and thermobaric bombs differ in usefulness". Burky says that the weapon depicted in the video appears to be a fuel-air explosive, based on its shape.

German military analyst Sascha Lange speaking at Deutsche Welle pointed out multiple discrepancies of the released video and expressed his skepticism.

John Pike, an analyst at the think tank GlobalSecurity, says he believes the weapon is roughly as powerful as the Russians claim. What he does not necessarily believe is that the weapon is new. He says the Russians have possessed a range of thermobaric weapons for at least four decades.

Robert Hewson, an editor for Jane's Information Group, told the BBC it was likely that FOAB indeed represented the world's biggest non-nuclear bomb. "You can argue about the numbers and how you scale this but the Russians have a long and proven history of developing weapons in the thermobaric class", he says. UPI claimed the device "would enormously boost Russia's conventional military capabilities".

See also
Massive Ordnance Penetrator
Grand Slam (bomb)
Soviet atomic bomb project
Tsar Bomba

References

Modern thermobaric weapons of Russia
Modern incendiary weapons of Russia
Aerial bombs of Russia
Russian inventions
Military equipment introduced in the 2000s